Lookin' Good is the thirty-third solo studio album by American country music singer-songwriter Loretta Lynn. It was released on October 13, 1980, by MCA Records.

Commercial performance 
The album peaked at No. 17 on the Billboard Top Country Albums chart. The album's first single. "Cheatin' on a Cheater", and second single, "Somebody Led Me Away", both peaked at No. 20 on the Billboard Hot Country Songs chart.

Track listing

Personnel 
Adapted from album liner notes.
Harold Bradley – guitar
Owen Bradley – producer
David Briggs – piano
Gene Chrisman – drums
Johnny Christopher – guitar
Ray Edenton – guitar
Sonny Garrish – steel guitar
Lloyd Green – steel guitar
Slick Lawson – photography
Mike Leech – bass
Kenny Malone – drums
Grady Martin – guitar
Charlie McCoy – harmonica
The Nashville Sounds – backing vocals
Hargus "Pig" Robbins – piano
Hal Rugg – steel guitar
Pete Wade – guitar
Bobby Wood – piano
Reggie Young – guitar

Chart positions 
Album – Billboard (North America)

Singles – Billboard (North America)

References 

1980 albums
Loretta Lynn albums
Albums produced by Owen Bradley
MCA Records albums